The Purple Album may refer to:
 The Purple Album (Purple City album)
 The Purple Album (Whitesnake album)
 3 (The Purple Album), by Lukas Graham